Headstrong is the eponymous debut release and sole album of the band of the same name. It was released on RCA Records in 2002 and proved to be the group's only album before disbanding the following year.

The band chose Dan Brodbeck, the same man behind their demo, to produce the album in their hometown of London, Ontario, Canada..Headstrong features one single in "Adriana," which reached #15 on the Mainstream Rock Tracks and had a music video. Its style features elements of hip hop and funk intertwined with metal and has been compared to bands like Rage Against the Machine, 311, and Red Hot Chili Peppers.

Prior to the release of Headstrong, the band toured through Canada from November to December 2001. Following its release, they performed with Tommy Lee before being curiously pulled from touring in July 2002. The following month they were dropped by RCA Records.

Curiously, despite that all of the members and producers were Canadian by origin, 'Headstrong' was priced at $24.99 in local Canadian markets, making it difficult for the band to earn fans in their debut in their own territory.  The band cites these types of decisions in their reasons to exit the music business.

Reception

Headstrong received mixed reviews. Brian O'Neill of AllMusic described it as "a decidedly Caucasian rap-rock mélange that sounds like it's been heard before, but only because it has." However, Robin Steeley of Music Reviewer gave the album 6/10, noting that it "features dynamic production and skilled instrumentation." 
CANOE's Mike Ross also showed a mixed but overall positive reaction:
"For all the cryptic complaining from a singer who sounds like the guy from Soul Coughing when he raps and like every other wigga in the 'hood when he shouts, this is a powerful rap-metal offering that puts shame to all that came before it - or at least adds maturity to a particularly obnoxious and posturing musical genre. . . With inventive production and instrumentation throughout, Headstrong is intelligent rap-metal, if such a thing is possible."

Track listing
 "All of the Above" – 4:01
 "Backlash" – 3:37
 "Inside Joke" – 3:16
 "Swing Harder (Temper Temper)" – 4:10
 "Built" – 0:38
 "Adriana" – 3:31
 "Do What You Feel Like" – 2:53
 "I Am for Real" – 4:20
 "Get In" – 3:15
 "Hoodies & Hood" – 4:01
 "State" – 3:41
 "Open Season" – 3:51

Personnel
 Matt Kinna - vocals
 Jon Cohen - bass guitar
 Joel Krass - guitar
 Brian Matthews - drums
 Dan Brodbeck - producer
 Jack Joseph Puig - mixing

Charts

References

2002 debut albums
RCA Records albums
Headstrong (band) albums